Banksia cynaroides is a species of shrub that is endemic to Western Australia. It has crowded, linear, pinnatifid leaves, white and dull golden yellow flowers and few follicles in each head.

Description
The lobes of the leaves are triangular and sharply pointed and covered with white hairs on the lower side. The flowers are arranged in heads of between fifteen and twenty that are often clustered together.

Taxonomy and naming
This species was first formally described in 1964 by Charles Austin Gardner who gave it the name Dryandra cyanoides and published the description in the Journal of the Royal Society of Western Australia from specimens he collected near Pingelly. In 2007, Austin Mast and Kevin Thiele transferred all the dryandras to the genus Banksia and this species became Banksia cynaroides. The specific epithet (cynaroides) refers to a perceived similarity of this species to those in the thistle-like genus Cynara.

Distribution and habitat
Banksia cynaroides grows in kwongan from Pingelly to Woodanilling.

Ecology
A 2008 assessment of the potential impact of climate change on this species found that it is likely to be driven to extinction by loss of habitat by 2080, even under mild climate change scenarios.

Conservation status
Banksia cynaroides is classified as "Priority Four" by the Government of Western Australia Department of Parks and Wildlife, meaning that is rare or near threatened.

References

cynaroides
Endemic flora of Western Australia
Eudicots of Western Australia
Plants described in 1964
Taxa named by Kevin Thiele